Atlético Nacional  is a Honduran football club based in Villanueva, Honduras.

History
They took over the Ingenio Villanueva franchise to play in the Honduran second division from the 2013 Clausura. They were named Atlético Nacional after being bought by a Colombian company. Ingenio Villanueva were promoted to the second tier themselves in summer 2012, after Pablo Zapata scored a hattrick to beat Merendón 3–1 in the second leg of the Liga Mayor championship final.

References

Football clubs in Honduras